This is a list of parliamentary by-elections in the United Kingdom held between 1900 and 1918, with the names of the incumbent and victor and their respective parties.  Where seats changed political party at the election, the result is highlighted: pink for a Labour (including Labour Representation Committee) gain, light blue for a Conservative (including Liberal Unionist, Irish Unionist and Scottish Unionist) gain, orange for a Liberal (including Liberal-Labour) gain, green for a Sinn Féin gain, light green for an Irish Parliamentary Party gain and grey for any other gain.

Resignations

Where the cause of by-election is given as "resignation" or "seeks re-election", this indicates that the incumbent was appointed on his own request to an "office of profit under the Crown", either the Steward of the Chiltern Hundreds or the Steward of the Manor of Northstead.  These appointments are made as a constitutional device for leaving the House of Commons, whose Members are not permitted to resign.

By-elections

References

F. W. S. Craig, British Parliamentary Election Statistics 1832-1987
F. W. S. Craig, British Parliamentary Election Results 1885-1918
F. W. S. Craig, Chronology of British Parliamentary By-elections 1833-1987

1900
20th century in the United Kingdom